The 2019–20 Central Michigan Chippewas men's basketball team represented Central Michigan University during the 2019–20 NCAA Division I men's basketball season. The Chippewas, led by eighth-year head coach Keno Davis, played their home games at McGuirk Arena as members of the West Division of the Mid-American Conference. They finished the season 14–18, 7–11 in MAC play to finish in fourth place in the West Division. They lost in the first round of the MAC tournament to Ohio.

Previous season
The Chippewas finished the 2018–19 season 23–12, 10–8 in MAC play to finish in second place in the West Division. They defeated Western Michigan in the first round of the MAC tournament and Kent State to advance to the quarterfinals where they lost to 18th ranked Buffalo. They were invited to the College Basketball Invitational where were defeated by DePaul.

Offseason

Departures

Incoming Transfers

Recruiting class of 2019

Roster

Schedule and results

|-
!colspan=9 style=| Non-conference regular season

|-
!colspan=9 style=| MAC regular season

|-
!colspan=9 style=| MAC tournament

Source

See also
 2019–20 Central Michigan Chippewas women's basketball team

References

Central Michigan
Central Michigan Chippewas men's basketball seasons